The enzyme 2-oxo-3-(5-oxofuran-2-ylidene)propanoate lactonase (EC 3.1.1.91, naaC (gene); systematic name 2-oxo-3-(5-oxofuran-2-ylidene)propanoate lactonohydrolase) catalyses the reaction

 2-oxo-3-(5-oxofuran-2-ylidene)propanoate + H2O  maleylpyruvate

This enzyme is isolated from the soil bacterium Bradyrhizobium sp. JS329.

References

External links 
 

EC 3.1.1